The State Committee for Technical Regulation and Consumer Policy (spelling in Ukrainian: Derzhspozhivstandard, or DSSU) is the Ukrainian state standards organization, established in 2002.  It is the successor to the State Committee of Ukraine for Standardization, Metrology and Certification (Derzhstandart), which in turn was preceded by the Gosstandart standards agency of the Soviet Union, before Ukrainian independence in 1991.

External links 
 State Committee for Technical Regulation and Consumer Policy official website
 State Committee for Technical Regulation and Consumer Policy at the Ukrainian government portal
 Ukrainian Certification Bureau Advisory

Standards
ukraine
2002 establishments in Ukraine
Standards organizations in Ukraine
Ministry of Economic Development, Trade and Agriculture